Mary Queeny (1913–2003) was a Lebanese born Egyptian actress and film producer.

Biography
She was born Mary Boutros Younis in 1913 to a Lebanese Christian family in Lebanon. Her mother's cousin was Asaad Dagher, a writer and journalist at the Al-Ahram newspaper. In 1923 she moved to Cairo with her aunt, actress and film producer Assia Dagher. She took the name Mary Queeny when she was 12. She married Egyptian film actor and director Ahmad Galal in 1940. Their son is film director Nader Galal. Until her retirement in 1982, she produced all of the films he directed.

Queeny became a popular actress and producer in a pioneering age of Egyptian cinema. Her first role was in 1929 in the film Ghadat al-sahara (The Desert Beauty). She went on to star in all of her aunt's subsequent films. She appeared in 20 films and was among the first women in Egypt to appear on screen without a veil.

With her husband she founded Galal Films in 1942; in 1944 it became Gala Studios. During the Golden Age of Egyptian film, it was one of the five largest studios. In 1958 she established a film colour processing laboratory, which in 1963 she sold to the Misr Company, now Misr International, which was later acquired by Youssef Chahine and his niece, Marianne Khoury.

Queeny died on 23 November 2003 in Cairo of a heart attack. She was 90.

Selected filmography
Pangs Of Conscience (1931)
When A Woman Loves (1933)
Rebellious Girl (1940)(in which she took her first leading role)
Prisoner No 17 (1949)
The Seventh Wife (1950)
Sacrificing My Love (1951).
Women Without Men (1953), the last in which she acted, was made by Egypt's leading living director, Youssef Chahine

References

External links

 Mary Queeny filmography

1913 births
2003 deaths
Egyptian film actresses
Egyptian film producers
Lebanese film actresses
Lebanese emigrants to Egypt
Naturalized citizens of Egypt
Egyptian child actresses